Samir Dash is a techie and an entrepreneur from Rourkela, Orissa.

In 2007, Samir hosted "MobileWish" — a unique software application that can be used to send and receive animated and customised e-greetings on GPRS-enabled mobile phones with Internet connection.

In 2009 he developed and launched "Pocket Travel Assistant" (PTA) — a mobile application that can be downloaded to symbian mobile phones —  provided every possible information needed by a traveller.

Samir has been awarded globally for his initiatives in mobile content and applications, namely "The Manthan Award South Asia 2009", "World Summit Award Mobile 2010".

Samir authored a number of books on critical theory & UX, namely "Beginners Guide To Modern Critical Theory" and "Quick and Dirty Guide for Developers: Adobe Edge Preview 3 in 4 Hours"

References

External links
 Travelling made easier with a pocketdigital guide, Mobility Techzone, June 2010
 Techie creates greeting software, The Telegraph, Friday, 24 August 2007 
 Oriya youth develops e-greetings solution (Interview), Odisha.in, 21 Aug 2007 
 e-greetings on mobiles!, The Economic Times, 21 Aug 2007

Businesspeople from Odisha
Living people
1982 births
People from Rourkela